National Highway 150E (NH 150E) is a  National Highway in India starting from Gulbarga and ends at Solapur.

References

National highways in India